Eupithecia rediviva is a moth in the family Geometridae. It is found in Kenya, South Africa and Uganda.

References

Moths described in 1917
rediviva
Moths of Africa